Paweł Kużmicki (born 25 August 1973) is a Polish sailor. He competed in the 49er event at the 2000 Summer Olympics.

References

External links
 

1973 births
Living people
Polish male sailors (sport)
Olympic sailors of Poland
Sailors at the 2000 Summer Olympics – 49er
People from Mrągowo
Sportspeople from Warmian-Masurian Voivodeship